Live at the Electric is a British comedy series that aired on BBC Three from 31 May 2012 and 28 February 2014 and is hosted by Russell Kane who performed stand-up in between comedy sketches from a variety of performers such as Joe Wilkinson and Diane Morgan's double act Two Episodes of Mash. It also featured comedy duo Totally Tom serving as backstage crew for the show.

External links

2012 British television series debuts
2014 British television series endings
BBC television comedy
British stand-up comedy television series
Television shows shot at BBC Elstree Centre